George Langworthy is an American film director, producer and writer. He is best known for his work on Cake: A Wedding Story (2007) and Vanishing of the Bees (2009).

Early life and education 
Langworthy attended Rice University and spent his senior year on a scholarship to Trinity College, Cambridge University. While a student at Cambridge, he wrote and performed sketches with the Footlights comedic troupe. He received an M.F.A. in Screenwriting as a fellow in the Michener Center for Writers at the University of Texas.

Career 
Langworthy began his career in 1993, as a member of the editorial staff of American Heart, a drama film starring Jeff Bridges and directed by Martin Bell.

While working on his M.F.A., he served as the cinematographer for the biographical documentary Janis Joplin Slept Here, featuring Richard Linklater and Clifford Antone and awarded Best Documentary at the 1994 Houston International Film Festival.

In 1996, he directed a 12-minute comedy entitled Breezeway. The short film premiered at the Sundance Film Festival and was broadcast on PBS, the BBC and Canal +.

In 2002, Langworthy filmed and produced videos of live performances of bands such as The White Stripes, Devo and No Doubt.

In 2007, Langworthy co-wrote the screenplay for Cake: A Wedding Story with fellow Cambridge University alumni, Iain Weatherby. The film was directed by Will Wallace and won the award for Best Comedy Feature Film in the Other Venice Film Festival.

In 2009, he served as the director, producer, writer and cinematographer for the 90-minute environmental documentary Vanishing of the Bees. The film was released in the U.K. on October 9, 2009 and re-released in the U.S. with a new edit which was narrated by Elliot Page. The documentary received the best documentary award at the Idyllwild International Festival of Cinema, the Cosmic Cine Film Festival and the Ecocup Film Festival.

In 2019, Langworthy produced, wrote and edited the documentary Big Fur, which premiered at the Slamdance Film Festival.  The film secured a distribution deal with 1091 Pictures, and has earned a 100% approval rating on Rotten Tomatoes based on 14 reviews.

Filmography

References

External links 
 Official website
 

Living people
American film directors
American film producers
American film editors
American male screenwriters
American documentary film directors
People from Kansas City, Kansas
Alumni of the University of Cambridge
Year of birth missing (living people)